The 1940 Queen's University of Belfast by-election was held on 2 November 1940.  The by-election was held due to the resignation of the incumbent Ulster Unionist MP, Thomas Sinclair.  It was won by the unopposed Unionist candidate Douglas Savory.

Result

Previous result

References

1940 elections in the United Kingdom
20th century in Belfast
November 1940 events
Queen
Queen
Unopposed by-elections to the Parliament of the United Kingdom (need citation)
1940 elections in Northern Ireland